Adam See Kok Luen bin Abdullah, formerly known as See Kok Luen is a Malaysian footballer who currently plays for Melaka United FC in the 2020 Malaysia M3 League.

Personal life
Kok Luen has full name of See Kok Luen. Kok Luen was born in Jasin, Malacca on 3 June 1988.

See Kok Luen career started when he joined Johor FC in the Malaysia Cup.

See Kok Luen has ended his single life after being legally married to the apple of his eye, Norfajrina Idris at Kampung Nyalas, Jasin on May 19, 2017. Before marriage, See Kok Luen and Norfajrina Idris have different religions. But Kok Luen converted to Islam with the name of Adam in late January 2017 before marrying his wife.

Career
Known for his peregrinating football career, Adam has traveled and played as a footballer in nine clubs in his career.

International career
Adam was part of the national team for the 2011 VFF Cup, held in Vietnam.

Career statistics

Club

Honours

League

Club
Penang
Malaysia Premier League : Runner-up 2015
Melaka United
 Malaysia Premier League :2016
Selangor United
 Malaysia FAM League : Runners-up 2018

Cup
Johor Darul Ta'zim
Malaysia FA Cup :Runner-up 2013

International
Malaysia U23
VFF Cup : third placed 2011

References

External links
 

1988 births
Living people
Malaysian footballers
Kuala Lumpur City F.C. players
Kedah Darul Aman F.C. players
People from Malacca
Melaka United F.C. players
Petaling Jaya Rangers F.C. players
Malaysian Muslims
Converts to Islam
Association football midfielders